Lǔ is the pinyin romanization of the Chinese surname written  in simplified character and  in traditional character. It is also spelled Lo according to the Cantonese pronunciation. Lu 鲁 is listed 49th in the Song Dynasty classic text Hundred Family Surnames. As of 2008, Lu 鲁 is the 115th most common surname in China.

Origin
According to several ancient genealogy texts including the Tang Dynasty Yuanhe Xing Zuan, Xing Pu (姓谱), and Xingshi Kaolue (姓氏考略), the surname Lu 鲁 originated from the ancient State of Lu, which was founded by Bo Qin, son of the Duke of Zhou, in the 11th century BC. During the Warring States period, Lu was conquered by the State of Chu, one of the seven major powers at the time, in 256 BC. Many people of Lu subsequently adopted the name of their former state as their surname. It is considered a branch of Ji 姬, the royal surname of the state of Lu.

Notable people
 Lu Ban (魯班; 507–440 BC), carpenter, engineer and inventor of the State of Lu
 Lu Zhonglian (魯仲連; 305–245 BC), scholar of the State of Qi in the Warring States period
 Lu Su (魯肅; 172–217), politician and diplomat serving under Sun Quan of Eastern Wu
 Lu Qin (鲁钦; died 1626), Ming Dynasty general
 Lu Xun (魯迅; 1881–1936), pen name of Zhou Shuren (周樹人), one of China's most influential writers
 Lu Diping (魯滌平; 1887–1935), Kuomintang general and governor of several provinces
 Lu Gwei-djen (魯桂珍; Lu Guizhen; 1904–1991), academic, wife of Joseph Needham
 Lu Dadong (鲁大东; 1915–1998), politician, Communist Party Chief of Chongqing and Governor of Sichuan
 Lu Ping (魯平; 1927–2015), politician and diplomat
 Lu Guanqiu (鲁冠球; born 1945), entrepreneur, one of the richest people in China
 Lo Chun-shun (魯振順; Lu Zhenshun; born 1957), Hong Kong actor
 Lu Zhishen (魯智深), fictional character in the classical novel Water Margin
 Kristie Lu Stout (魯可蒂, born 1974) American journalist and news anchor

See also 
 Mencius (孟子), Mencius; born Mèng Kē (孟軻); or Mengzi (372–289 BC or 385–303 or 302 BC) was a Chinese Confucian philosopher who has often been described as the "second Sage", that is, after only Confucius himself. Duke Huan of Lu's son through Qingfu (慶父) was the ancestor of Mencius. He was descended from Duke Yang of the State of Lu (魯煬公). Duke Yang was the son of Bo Qin, who was the son of the Duke of Zhou of the Zhou dynasty royal family. 
 Meng (surname 孟).

References

Chinese-language surnames
Individual Chinese surnames